Nicolo Pasetti (born Nicolò Bernardino Pasetti Bombardella) is an American-Italian actor. He is best known for his work as Christian Hellmann in The Guernsey Literary and Potato Peel Pie Society and as Deputy Sheriff Martin in the spaghetti-western TV show That Dirty Black Bag.

Early life and career
Pasetti aspired to become an actor at an early age. In an interview he explains that even though his parents wanted him to consider different careers Pasetti insisted on pursuing acting without compromise.

In 2017 Nicolo Pasetti was signed to star in the historical drama The Guernsey Literary and Potato Peel Pie Society, directed by Mike Newell as German soldier Christian Hellmann, alongside Hollywood stars such as Lily James and Michiel Huisman.

In 2019 Pasetti has been cast as the male lead Josh in The Taste Of Prey, an independent mystery thriller directed by Guido Tölke that's set in the 1980s in an unknown, small-town, which harbors a dark secret that can be traced back to an old legend from the Thirty Year War. He also played one of the leads and the police's prime suspect in an episode of the German tv crime series  and was cast in the Netflix series The Queen's Gambit, directed by Scott Frank.

The years 2020 to 2021 saw Pasetti star in multiple films and television series. Director Lucio Pellegrini's biopic on Italy's music legend Renato Carosone was Pasetti's first appearance in Italian television, playing the famous singer and guitarist Peter Van Wood. In 2021 Pasetti has been cast in the Dracula horror movie Last Voyage of the Demeter with Corey Hawkins, Liam Cunningham and David Dastmalchian in the leads, produced by Steven Spielberg's production company Amblin Entertainment, in Bron Studio's new Spaghetti-western titled That Dirty Black Bag, in which Pasetti plays a shifty deputy sheriff named Martin alongside Douglas Booth and Dominic Cooper, in Industry the British-American television drama series produced by HBO playing the successful entrepreneur and CEO of a prestigious fashion label from Milan, Rocco Carbone, and as John F. Kennedy's best friend Lem Billings in the Arte tv-production Kennedy's Love for Europe. He also played the world-famous tennis player Gottfried von Cramm in Netflix's film El Dorado, coming out in late 2022.

Filmography

Film

Television

References

External links
 Nicolo Pasetti at Focus
 
 Nicolo Pasetti on Crush Agency
 Nicolo Pasetti on Castforward

Living people
Place of birth missing (living people)
University of Music and Theatre Leipzig alumni
American male film actors
Year of birth missing (living people)